Ricky Pardy (born September 24, 1961) was the head football coach for the Marist College football program from 1989 to 1991. Here he became the youngest head coach in the NCAA at 27 years old. After leaving Marist, he was the head coach at Bates College. He led the Marist Red Foxes to their program's first conference championship in 1990 when they finished 4–0 in Atlantic Central Football Conference play.

Pardy attended Ithaca College where he was an All-American offensive lineman.

Pardy is not related to his successor at Marist, Jim Parady, despite their similarly spelled surnames.

Head coaching record

References

1961 births
Living people
Bates Bobcats football coaches
Ithaca Bombers football players
Marist Red Foxes football coaches